Anjali Naidu is an Indian actress. She was a prominent lead actress during the 1980s in Malayalam and Tamil.She made her cinematic debut with the Malayalam film,  Mela.

Partial filmography

References

External links

 Anjali Naidu at MSI

Actresses in Malayalam cinema
Indian film actresses
Actresses in Tamil cinema
Actresses from Andhra Pradesh
Living people
20th-century Indian actresses
Place of birth missing (living people)
Year of birth missing (living people)
Actresses in Hindi cinema